Hoàng Long may refer to:

 Hoàng Long, Phú Xuyên, a commune in Phú Xuyên District, Hanoi
 Hoàng Long, Gia Lâm, a village in Đặng Xá commune, Gia Lâm district, Hanoi
 Nho Quan district, a district in Ninh Bình province previously named Hoàng Long

See also 
 Huanglong (disambiguation)